Helaspis is a monotypic fossil genus of true bugs belonging to the family Diaspididae. The only species is Helaspis mexicana.

The species is similar to Aspidiotus.

References

Diaspididae
Prehistoric insect genera